Saturday Showcase is an Australian television series that aired in 1960 on Melbourne station HSV-7. Lasting about three months, it was a variety series hosted by Michael Cole. It aired in a 90-minute time-slot. It debuted 16 January.

References

External links
Saturday Showcase on IMDb

1960 Australian television series debuts
1960 Australian television series endings
Black-and-white Australian television shows
English-language television shows
Australian variety television shows